Allantospermum is a genus of trees up to 90 m tall  in family Irvingiaceae. Formerly it has been included in families Simaroubaceae and Ixonanthaceae. It contains the following two species:

 Allantospermum borneense - Malesia
 Allantospermum multicaule - Madagascar

References

Irvingiaceae
Malpighiales genera